West Springfield is a census-designated place (CDP) in Fairfax County, Virginia, United States. The population was 23,369 at the 2020 census.

Geography
West Springfield is located in central Fairfax County at  (38.788436, −77.232802). Its borders are the Norfolk Southern Railway Washington District to the north, Accotink Creek to the east, Fort Belvoir and the Fairfax County Parkway to the south, and Pohick Creek and a power line to the west.

Demographics

At the 2010 census there were 22,460 people, 10,289 households, and 7,840 families in the CDP. The racial makeup of the CDP was 75.31% White, 4.89% African American, 0.28% Native American, 13.91% Asian, 0.06% Pacific Islander, 2.55% from other races, and 3.01% from two or more races. Hispanic or Latino of any race were 7.33%.

Of the 10,289 households 36.8% had children under the age of 18 living with them, 64.4% were married couples living together, 8.9% had a female householder with no husband present, and 23.8% were non-families. 18.8% of households were one person and 4.5% were one person aged 65 or older. The average household size was 2.76 and the average family size was 3.16.

The age distribution was 25.6% under the age of 18, 6.2% from 18 to 24, 29.3% from 25 to 44, 28.9% from 45 to 64, and 9.9% 65 or older. The median age was 39 years. For every 100 females, there were 95.3 males. For every 100 females age 18 and over, there were 91.4 males.

According to a 2007 estimate, the median household income was $97,203, and the median family income  was $106,667. Males had a median income of $61,953 versus $40,380 for females. The per capita income for the CDP was $35,375. About 1.7% of families and 2.4% of the population were below the poverty line, including 2.6% of those under age 18 and 0.5% of those age 65 or over.

Education
Fairfax County Public Schools operates public schools.
 Cardinal Forest Elementary School
 Keene Mill Elementary School
 Rolling Valley Elementary School
 West Springfield Elementary School
 Irving Middle School
 West Springfield High School

Kings Park Elementary School was defined as being in the West Springfield CDP in the 1990 U.S. Census and the 2000 U.S. Census, but as of the 2010 U.S. Census it was defined as being in the Kings Park CDP. It has a Springfield postal address.

St. Bernadette Catholic School of the Roman Catholic Diocese of Arlington is in West Springfield CDP; it has a Springfield postal address. Holy Spirit School, of the same diocese, has been defined as being in Wakefield CDP since 2010 but was previously in West Springfield CDP. It has an Annandale postal address.

References

Springfield, Virginia
Census-designated places in Virginia
Washington metropolitan area
Census-designated places in Fairfax County, Virginia